Nandhakumar Sekar (born 20 December 1995) is an Indian professional footballer who plays as a winger for Indian Super League club Odisha.

Career
Sekar made his professional debut in the I-League with Chennai City on 19 February 2017 against Shillong Lajong. He started the match and played 51 minutes as Chennai City lost 4–1. He scored his first professional goal for the club on 12 March 2017 against East Bengal. He scored the equalizing goal for Chennai City in the 57th minute which eventually led to the team winning 2–1.

Odisha
On 17 August 2022, Sekar scored a stunning goal assisted by goalkeeper Lalthuammawia Ralte in the season opener against NorthEast United in the Durand Cup, which ended in a thumping 6–0 win.

International career
He made his debut for Indian U23 national team in a friendly against Singapore U23 football team.

Career statistics

Honours
Hindustan Eagles
Chennai Football League: 2014–15

References

1993 births
Living people
People from Salem, Tamil Nadu
Indian footballers
Chennai City FC players
Association football midfielders
I-League players
Indian Super League players
Odisha FC players
Footballers from Tamil Nadu